Nikolina Milić (Serbian Cyrillic: Николина Милић; born April 12, 1994) is a Serbian professional basketball center for the Minnesota Lynx of the Women's National Basketball Association (WNBA).

She represented Serbian national basketball team at the FIBA Women's EuroBasket 2019 in Serbia and Latvia, where they won the bronze medal.

WNBA

Minnesota Lynx
Milić signed with the Minnesota Lynx on May 6, 2022, to a hardship contract.  Milić played in 17 games for the Lynx including 3 starts. She scored a career-high in points against the Indiana Fever with 23 points, including 13 in the third quarter alone, on 11 for 19 shooting, along with six rebounds, and three assists. Head Coach Cheryl Reeve stated that she had been looking at Milić to come over after coaching against her during Olympic play and that she really started to figure things out as she got more time on the court during her rookie season. On June 23, 2022, Milić was released from her hardship contract as Sylvia Fowles was cleared to comeback to play. Milić signed a 7-Day Contract to return to the Lynx on June 26, 2022. On August 10, 2022, Milić was released from her Hardship Contract when Aerial Powers became healthy again.

WNBA career statistics

Regular season

|-
| align="left" | 2022
| align="left" | Minnesota
| 31 || 4 || 11.7 || .548 || .273 || .738 || 3.0 || 0.7 || 0.3 || 0.3 || 1.4 || 6.0
|-
| align="left" | Career
| align="left" | 1 year, 1 team
| 31 || 4 || 11.7 || .548 || .273 || .738 || 3.0 || 0.7 || 0.3 || 0.3 || 1.4 || 6.0

See also 
 List of Serbian WNBA players

References

External links
Profile at fiba.basketball

1994 births
Living people
Minnesota Lynx players
People from Trebinje
Serbs of Bosnia and Herzegovina
Serbian expatriate basketball people in Hungary
Serbian expatriate basketball people in Italy
Serbian expatriate basketball people in Spain
Serbian expatriate basketball people in the United States
Serbian women's basketball players
Centers (basketball)
Undrafted Women's National Basketball Association players
Women's National Basketball Association players from Serbia